Senad Jarović (born 20 January 1998) is a German professional footballer who plays as a forward for Minaur Baia Mare.

Career
Jarović made his professional debut in the Slovenian PrvaLiga for Domžale on 28 February 2016 in a game against Krka and scored on his debut.

On 10 February 2019, Jarović signed with SønderjyskE in the Danish Superliga until the summer 2022. On 21 August 2019, he was loaned out to ViOn Zlaté Moravce for the rest of 2019. SønderjyskE announced on 24 January 2020 that the player's contract had been terminated.

Personal life
Born in Langenfeld, Jarović is of Bosnian descent.

Honours
Petrolul Ploiești
Liga II: 2021–22

References

External links
 PrvaLiga profile 
 
 

1998 births
Living people
People from Mettmann (district)
Sportspeople from Düsseldorf (region)
Footballers from North Rhine-Westphalia
German footballers
Bosnia and Herzegovina footballers
Association football forwards
NK Domžale players
NK Dob players
FC Spartak Trnava players
SønderjyskE Fodbold players
FC ViOn Zlaté Moravce players
ŠKF Sereď players
NK Radomlje players
Liga II players
FC Petrolul Ploiești players
CS Minaur Baia Mare (football) players
Slovenian PrvaLiga players
Slovenian Second League players
Slovak Super Liga players
Danish Superliga players
German expatriate footballers
Expatriate footballers in Slovenia
German expatriate sportspeople in Slovenia
Expatriate footballers in Slovakia
German expatriate sportspeople in Slovakia
Expatriate men's footballers in Denmark
German expatriate sportspeople in Denmark
Expatriate footballers in Romania
German expatriate sportspeople in Romania